The Federal Republic of Germany – Finance Agency is the central service provider for the Federal Republic of Germany's borrowing and debt management. Thus it is wholly owned by the Federal Republic of Germany, represented by the Federal Ministry of Finance. Legal basis is the Federal Government Debt Management Act (Bundesschuldenwesengesetz) that constitutes a special public control and supervision by the Federal Ministry of Finance which in addition itself regularly reports on debt management issues to budget experts from the German Bundestag.

History
The company was formed by the Federal Republic of Germany on 19 September 2000, by amendment to the statutes of 29 August 1990, from the Berlin-based CVU Systemhaus Abwicklungsgesellschaft mbH  and is headquartered in Frankfurt am Main.

Since 2001, the Finance Agency organizes the borrowing of the Federal Republic of Germany and performs its debt management. It operates in the international financial markets solely and exclusively in the name of and for the account of the Federal Republic of Germany. On 1 August 2006 it was merged with the former Federal Securities Administration (formerly Federal Debt Administration). Since then, the Federal Finance Agency has also offered private investors free bookkeeping for Federal securities in the form of a book entry account and its toll-free acquisition, similar to the U.S. TreasuryDirect program. From July 1, 2008, the Finance Agency distributed the new developed Federal day bond (Tagesanleihe) for private investors.

Because of the shrinking demand from retail customers, resulting in a decreasing share and importance of the retail client business for the Federal funding since the mid-nineties, in 2012 the German Ministry of Finance decided not to continue the retail client business as it became uneconomic. So 2013 the Finance Agency stopped issuing Government securities for retail investors – especially the Federal savings notes, the Federal Treasury financing papers and the Federal day bond. Today the remaining exchange-listed German Government bonds and bills can only be bought through banks.

Beside the traditional Government securities like Federal bonds, Federal notes, Federal Treasury notes and Treasury discount paper the Finance Agency also organized issuances of new funding instruments. After the first US-Dollar bond was introduced in May 2005 the first inflation-linked bond followed in March 2016. In 2013 the Bund-Länder-Anleihe was issued: the first joint issue of the Federal Republic of Germany together with 10 German states.

Between 2010 and 2013 the Finance Agency performed several services for the European Financial Stability Facility (EFSF). In 2019, it announced plans to launch its first green bond with a multi-billion euro issue and with the same maturity and coupon as conventional securities.

Since the beginning of 2018, the finance agency has been entrusted with the sponsorship of the Federal Financial Market Stabilization Agency (FMSA). At the same time, the finance agency took over the management/processing of the financial market stabilization fund (FMS or special fund financial market stabilization, SoFFin) from the FMSA, including the associated investments.

Operations & Management
The company carries out tasks in budget funding and short-term liquidity funding of the Federal government, which were previously performed locally by the Federal Ministry of Finance, the Bundesbank and the Federal Securities Administration. These activities include services in connection with the issuance of Federal securities, borrowing by promissory notes, the use of derivative financial instruments and money market operations to offset the account of the Federal Republic of Germany at the Bundesbank at the end of each day. Hereby the Finance Agency acts solely in the name and for the account of the Federal German Government. The legal basis and the credit line is given by the yearly Budget Act.

Additional services for the Federal Ministry of Finance, as representative of the Federal Republic of Germany, are market analyses, the development of models for portfolio management, risk monitoring, risk management and investor, press and public relations for German Government securities.
The first and foremost priority of the Finance Agency is to guarantee the solvency of the Federal Government at all times. Furthermore, the Finance Agency aims to keep the interest costs of the debt portfolio as low as possible in the mid-term and thereby limiting the interest rate risks of its debt portfolio.

The Federal Republic of Germany – Finance Agency is headed by Tammo Diemer and Carsten Lehr.

References

External links 
 www.deutsche-finanzagentur.de Official website of the Finance Agency
 www.bundesfinanzministerium.de Official website of the Federal Ministry of Finance
 www.bundesbank.de Official website of the Deutsche Bundesbank

Companies based in Frankfurt
Government-owned companies of Germany